The Trinity Bantams Men's Squash team is the intercollegiate men's squash team for Trinity College located in Hartford, Connecticut. The team competes in the New England Small College Athletic Conference within the College Squash Association. The college first fielded a team in 1941, making it one of the oldest college squash teams in the United States. Paul Assaiante is the current head coach. The assistant coach is Alister Walker.

History 
The Trinity Bantams men's squash team holds the record for the longest unbeaten streak in any intercollegiate sport in the nation's history. On January 18, 2012, Trinity's 252-game unbeaten streak ended in a 5–4 loss to the Yale Bulldogs. The Bantams won 13 consecutive national titles from 1999, when they first took home the Potter Trophy, through 2011. 

More recently, they are the 2017 and 2018 national champions.

The Bantams entered the 2023 championships seeded 6th, they went on to upset #3 Princeton and #2 Penn Before falling to Harvard in the final 5-4. For the second time in four Years, the Bantams made it to the National Championships Final under Coach Paul Assaiante.

The program has also garnered attention and praise from major media outlets such as ESPN, Sports Illustrated and USA Today, among others. They were recently ranked by ESPN as one of the top ten sports dynasties of all time.

Year-by-year results

Men's Squash 
Updated February 2022.

Players

Current roster 
Updated February 2023.

|}

Notable former players 
Notable alumni include:
 Basit Ashfaq '10 Former world #61, 3x 1st team All-American, 58-2 career record, 2008 and 2009 Individual Champion, 4x National Team Champion
 Christopher Binnie
 Vikram Malhotra
 Juan Camilo Vargas
 Kush Kumar
 Thoboki Mohohlo
 Miko Aijanen

References

External links

External links 
 

 
College men's squash teams in the United States
Squash in Connecticut
Sports clubs established in 1941
1941 establishments in Connecticut